Kazys Bizauskas  (14 February 1893, Pāvilosta, Courland Governorate – 26 June 1941) was a Lithuanian statesman, diplomat, author, and one of the twenty signatories of the Act of Independence of Lithuania.

Bizauskas first emerged as a writer while attending secondary school in Kaunas; he issued a hand-written periodical, Ateitis (The Future). He studied law at Moscow University from 1913 to 1915. After returning, he taught secondary school in Panevėžys. During the Conference of Vilnius he was elected to the Council of Lithuania as its secretary, and signed the Act of Independence in 1918. 

In 1920 Bizauskas was elected to the Constituent Assembly as a representative of the Christian Democratic Party. During the summer of 1920 he served as secretary-general at the negotiations that led to the formalization of the Soviet-Lithuanian Treaty of 1920. 

He held a number of diplomatic posts during the 1920s and 1930s, serving as Lithuanian envoy to the Vatican, the United States, the United Kingdom, Latvia, and the Netherlands. He also authored a secondary school textbook, contributed numerous articles to periodicals, and co-founded the Society of Bibliophiles and the publishing house Žinija. After the first Soviet occupation of Lithuania in 1940, he returned to his farm near Ukmergė, where he was arrested  and held in prison until Nazi Germany declared war on the USSR on 22 June 1941.

Bizauskas was transported to a Soviet prison in Minsk in June 1941; he was shot by the NKVD along with several thousand other prisoners on 26 June 1941.

References

"Bizauskas, Kazimieras". Encyclopedia Lituanica I: 372-373. (1970-1978). Ed. Simas Sužiedėlis. Boston, Massachusetts: Juozas Kapočius. LCCN 74-114275.

1893 births
1941 deaths
People from Pāvilosta Municipality
People from Courland Governorate
Members of the Council of Lithuania
Ministers of Education of Lithuania
Ambassadors of Lithuania to the United Kingdom
Ambassadors of Lithuania to the Netherlands
Ambassadors of Lithuania to the United States
Ambassadors of Lithuania to Latvia
Lithuanian diplomats
Lithuanian writers
Lithuanian people executed by the Soviet Union
People executed by the Soviet Union by firearm
Lithuanian independence activists
Burials at Rasos Cemetery